Thomas Jefferson Brookshier (December 16, 1931 – January 29, 2010) was an American professional football player, coach, and sportscaster. He was a starting defensive back for the Philadelphia Eagles of the National Football League (NFL) for seven seasons, from 1953 to 1961. He later paired with Pat Summerall on the primary broadcast team for NFL games on CBS during the 1970s.

Early life
Born and raised in Roswell, New Mexico, Brookshier graduated from Roswell High School in 1949. At RHS, he received all-state honors in football, basketball, and baseball.

As a three-year letterman in football at the University of Colorado (1950–52), he was a defensive back, fullback, and return specialist. One of his gridiron teammates was astronaut Jack Swigert, a crew member of the ill-fated Apollo 13 mission in 1970, and a congressman-elect in 1982.

Brookshier was also a relief pitcher on the CU baseball team, and played one season of minor league baseball in 1954 for the Roswell Rockets of the class-D Longhorn League.

NFL career
A tenth-round selection (117th overall) in the 1953 NFL Draft, Brookshier played defensive back for the Philadelphia Eagles of the National Football League from 1953 to 1961, missing both the 1954 and 1955 seasons to serve in the United States Air Force. A starter on the Eagles' NFL Championship team in 1960, he was selected for the Pro Bowl twice.

At age 29, Brookshier's playing career ended midway through the 1961 season; he sustained a compound fracture of his right leg while making a tackle on Willie Galimore in the 16–14 victory over the Chicago Bears at Franklin Field on November 5. He was a member of the Eagles' Honor Roll and was one of only eight players whose numbers were retired by the team; Brookshier's number was 40.

As a lieutenant, he was a backfield coach at the U.S. Air Force Academy for a  season in 1955.

Broadcasting career
Brookshier began sportscasting for WCAU-AM-FM-TV in Philadelphia in 1962, and became the station's sports director the following  He joined CBS in 1965 as a color commentator for Eagles telecasts, and continued to call regional action after the network moved away from dedicated team announcers in 1968.

In the early 1970s, Brookshier and Summerall co-hosted This Week in Pro Football, a weekly syndicated highlights show produced by NFL Films. After CBS dismissed its main pro football voice Ray Scott in 1974, the network went against its standard practice of using a professional announcer for play-by-play by promoting Summerall and partnering him with Brookshier. The two former NFL players became arguably U.S. television's most popular sports broadcasting team for the remainder of the decade. Describing the pair's on-air rapport, Summerall said, "With Brookie, it was more of a conversation, like two guys in a saloon." Besides many regular-season and playoff contests, most of which involved the Dallas Cowboys who were the National Football Conference's most dominant franchise at the time, the duo called Super Bowls X, XII, and XIV. Brookshier also worked pre- and post-game shows for four other Super Bowls. He and Summerall also appeared as themselves in the 1977 motion picture Black Sunday, which was partially filmed at Super Bowl X.

In 1976, Brookshier and Summerall called a heavyweight title fight between Muhammad Ali and Jean Pierre Coopman live in prime time from Puerto Rico on Friday, February 20. Brent Musburger and Phyllis George of The NFL Today co-hosted the telecast that night. Meanwhile, Don Dunphy supplied some commentary between rounds. A month earlier, CBS assigned Summerall and Brookshier to announce a Ken Norton bout against Pedro Lovell, a mere eight days before they called Super Bowl X.

Controversy
Brookshier became the subject of controversy because of a remark he made in  during an NFL broadcast of an Eagles–Saints game on December 11. After a program note for an upcoming telecast of an NCAA men's basketball game between defending national champion North Carolina State and Louisville, Brookshier said that the Louisville players had "a collective I.Q. of about forty, but they can play basketball." Given a chance to walk back the statement by partner Charlie Waters, Brookshier doubled down, saying "it's the truth."

This resulted in Neal Pilson, then president of CBS Sports, apologizing to Louisville school officials and later suspending Brookshier for the last weekend of the NFL regular  Louisville's athletic director, Bill Olsen, felt that the remark was racist, since Louisville's starting five were all African American. Brookshier later apologized, calling his remark "stupid" and "dumb", but was angered over CBS's reaction, saying "I'm not about to be judged on one comment."  He added, "I've done a lot of things for charity. Now my own network is bailing out on me and taking me off the air. After 20 years at CBS, I deserve better than this." The apology was accepted by the university and university president Donald Swain invited Brookshier to be the featured speaker at the school's annual football kickoff luncheon in Clarksville, Indiana on August 2, 1984. Brookshier was reinstated in CBS's announcing lineup for the 1984 season, continuing as a network commentator through 1987.

Later life
In 1989, he hosted the morning show of the then-nascent 610 WIP sports format; the program was called Breakfast with Brookshier, before he was paired with Angelo Cataldi and the program re-dubbed Brookie and the Rookie, and then finally simply Brookshier and Cataldi. He left broadcasting and was last known to be working as a consultant for CB Richard Ellis, an international commercial real-estate firm.

Brookshier died of cancer at Lankenau Medical Center on January 29, 2010. The Broadcast Pioneers of Philadelphia inducted Brookshier into their Hall of Fame in 2007.

References

External links
 

1931 births
2010 deaths
Air Force Falcons football coaches
American football defensive backs
American television reporters and correspondents
American television sports announcers
Baseball players from New Mexico
Boxing commentators
Deaths from cancer in Pennsylvania
College football announcers
Colorado Buffaloes football players
Eastern Conference Pro Bowl players
National Football League announcers
NFL Films people
People from Roswell, New Mexico
Players of American football from New Mexico
Philadelphia Eagles announcers
Philadelphia Eagles players
Roswell Rockets players
National Football League players with retired numbers